Marie Plácido (born 17 August 1987) is a Puerto Rican basketball player for Cangrejeras de Santurce and the Puerto Rican national team.

She participated in the 2018 FIBA Women's Basketball World Cup.

References

External links

1987 births
Living people
Forwards (basketball)
Puerto Rican women's basketball players
Sportspeople from Ponce, Puerto Rico